The Princess from Hoboken is a 1927 American silent comedy film directed by Allen Dale and featuring Boris Karloff. This is now considered to be a lost film.

Cast
 Edmund Burns as Terence O'Brien
 Blanche Mehaffey as Sheila O'Toole
 Ethel Clayton as Mrs. O'Brien
 Lou Tellegen as Prince Anton Balakrieff
 Babe London as Princess Sonia Alexandernova Karpoff
 Will Walling as Mr. O'Brien (as Will R. Walling)
 Charles McHugh as Pa O'Toole
 Aggie Herring as Ma O'Toole
 Charles Crockett as Whiskers
 Robert Homans as McCoy
 Harry A. Bailey as Cohen (as Harry Bailey)
 Sidney D'Albrook as Tony
 Broderick O'Farrell as Immigration Officer
 Boris Karloff as Pavel

See also
 Boris Karloff filmography
 List of lost films

References

External links

1927 films
Silent American comedy films
American silent feature films
American black-and-white films
1927 comedy films
Tiffany Pictures films
Lost American films
Films with screenplays by Sonya Levien
1927 lost films
Lost comedy films
1920s American films